Clint Newland is a New Zealand rugby union player.

Career

New Zealand
Newland was born in Dannevirke and attended New Plymouth Boys' High School as a boarder. In 1999, he made his provincial debut for Hawke's Bay against Poverty Bay in the NPC. He played in the NZ Divisional XV from 2002 to 2005 when the competition was revised to increase the number of NPC teams. He played in every match until 2007 when he was served a 10-week ban for knocking out Wellington prop Neemia Tialata.

In 2008, he won selection to the  Super Rugby squad. He was also selected for the NZ Māori team, but played just one game before a shoulder injury ruled him out of successive matches. He returned to the Highlanders and Hawke's Bay squads for the 2009 and 2010 seasons.

Ireland
In November 2010, Irish team Leinster announced the signing of Newland on a short term contract, running until February 2011. He had limited playing time during his time at Leinster.

South Africa
When his Leinster contract expired, he signed for South African domestic team . He represented them in the domestic Currie Cup and Vodacom Cup competitions and also played for the South African Kings at the 2011 IRB Nations Cup in Romania, also scoring a try against Portugal.

He left the Kings at the end of the 2012 Currie Cup First Division season, having played for the Kings for two seasons, making 32 appearances.

International
Newland made his debut for the NZ Māori in 2008.

Achievements
 2005 – 2nd Division Player of the Year

References

1980 births
Living people
Eastern Province Elephants players
Expatriate rugby union players in Ireland
Expatriate rugby union players in South Africa
Hawke's Bay rugby union players
Highlanders (rugby union) players
Leinster Rugby players
Māori All Blacks players
New Zealand expatriate rugby union players
New Zealand expatriate sportspeople in Ireland
New Zealand expatriate sportspeople in South Africa
New Zealand rugby union players
People educated at New Plymouth Boys' High School
Rugby union players from Dannevirke
Rugby union props